Liu Chi-chun (1908-1999) was the First Lady of the Republic of China (Taiwan) from 1975 until 1978 as the wife of Yen Chia-kan, former President of the Republic of China (Taiwan).

Biography
Liu Chi-chun was born at Suzhou, and her family was one of the four prominent families in Suzhou. She was the distant cousin of her later husband Yen Chia-kan. The first wife of Yen Chia-kan died in 1923 because of obstructed labour. After that, Yen continued to follow the choice of his parents to marry her at 24 December 1924.

She put much effort into looking after her new family, and she had nine children (five sons and four daughters). She and her husband were low-profile, so that their reputation were lower than other presidents and first ladies of the Republic of China (ROC). After she became the first lady, she continued to take care of her child, but not to participate on political topics. After Yen Chia-kan finished his presidency, she disappeared from public view. Moreover, there was no news about her at Taiwan anymore.

After her husband Yen Chia-kan died on December 24, 1993, she died at the same date six years later (in 1999) because of diseases of the lung, liver and kidney at Taipei Chongqing South Road official residence. Her marriage lasted for 70 years. Finally, her remains were interred at the Republic Of China Military Cemetery.

References 

1908 births
First ladies of the Republic of China
1999 deaths
Taiwanese people from Jiangsu